The following radio stations broadcast on AM frequency 1130 kHz: 1130 AM is a clear-channel frequency shared by Canada and The United States. CKWX Vancouver, KWKH Shreveport and WBBR New York City share Class A status of 1130 AM.

In Argentina 
 LRA21 in Santiago del Estero
 Show in Buenos Aires

In Canada 
Stations in bold are clear-channel stations.

In Mexico 

  In San Miguel Allende, Guanajuato
  in Texcoco, State of Mexico
  in Uruapan, Michoacán
  in Nogales, Sonora

In the United States 
Stations in bold are clear-channel stations.

In Uruguay 
 CX 30 Radio Nacional in Montevideo

References

Lists of radio stations by frequency